Bataclan may refer to:

Ba-ta-clan, a 1855 operetta by Jacques Offenbach
Bataclan (theatre), a theatre in Paris named after the operetta
Bataclan theatre massacre, November 2015 Paris attacks

Music
Bataclan 1989, by Maxime Le Forestier
Live from the Bataclan, a 1996 EP by Jeff Buckley
Bataclan, a 1998 album by Malavoi
Le Bataclan, a 2004 unofficial single by Prince
Le Bataclan '72, a 2004 album by members of The Velvet Underground
Live au Bataclan, a 2006 album by Jane Birkin

People with the surname
Emilio Bataclan (born 1940), Roman Catholic Bishop of the Philippines